The Daylesford Spa Country Railway (which is operated by the Central Highlands Tourist Railway) is a volunteer-operated  gauge tourist railway located in Victoria, Australia. It operates on a section of the closed and dismantled Daylesford line, and currently runs services between Daylesford and the hamlet of Bullarto.

History

Victorian Railways era
The original line was opened in two stages, from the mainline junction at Carlsruhe to the town of Trentham, on 16 February 1880. The remainder of the line was opened a month later on 17 March. The line initially had significant goods and passenger traffic, with 50,000 passengers travelling the line in 1884 alone. However, over the next seventy years, both traffic and the quality of line gradually degraded, until the last passenger service was replaced with a road coach in 1978.

Reopening as a tourist railway
The Central Highlands Tourist Railway was founded two years later, and set about restoring the railway to operating condition. After several years of restoration, trolley services commenced to a temporary terminus located in the Wombat State Forest in the latter half of the 1980s. On 15 September 1990 rail services commenced between Daylesford and the nearby hamlet of Musk. Another section of line was opened on 17 March 1997, allowing services to operate as far as Bullarto. As the station had been demolished, this required building a new platform and installing a portable station building. In 2002, the organisation changed its trading name from the Central Highlands Tourist Railway to the Daylesford Spa Country Railway.

On the evening of 23 February 2009, bushfires in the Daylesford region destroyed 1.6 kilometres of track running through the Wombat State Forest, with about 2000 sleepers destroyed, rails buckled, and the last two broad-gauge cattle pits on a running railway in Victoria destroyed. As a result, services were truncated, running out of Daylesford on the 1.7 km of line which remained unaffected. The repairs were expected to cost $250,000.

In August 2010, services to Musk were reinstated after repairs to the damaged section through the forest, and the rest of the line through to Bullarto was reopened in December 2013.

Rollingstock

DSCR Locomotives & Railmotors

Trailers and Carriages

Current operations and extension plans

The railway operates every Sunday, with five return services to Bullarto and one to Musk on its regular time table. In 2017, the railway commenced operations on Wednesdays during the school holidays with three return services to Bullarto. On the first Saturday evening of each month, the railway operates the Silver Streak Food and Wine Train., although these have been suspended since March 2020 

The railway also runs the famous Daylesford Sunday Market within the station grounds, which has been an important part of the railway's activities since the early 1980s.

In 2018 a new platform opened adjacent to the Passing Clouds winery at Musk, opening up new opportunities for passengers to enjoy the hospitality of the winery and travel there by vintage train.

For many years, there have been plans to extend the line to Trentham. While these were on the back burner for some time, this is now in planning and is considered a priority project by Hepburn Shire Council. The project will see the reopening of the disused Lyonville and Trentham stations, and the construction of a new station at Wombat Forest. No date has been set for when the line will reopen.

Line guide

See also 
 Tourist and Heritage Railways Act

References
 Osborne, M., (1993?), Timber, Spuds and Spa, A descriptive history and lineside guide of the railways in the Daylesford district 1880–1993, Australian Railway Historical Society: Victoria Division,

External links
http://www.dscr.com.au/ - official site

Tourist railways in Victoria (Australia)
Heritage railways in Australia
1880 establishments in Australia
1978 disestablishments in Australia
1990 establishments in Australia